Goldenberg is a surname of Jewish-Austrian or Jewish Romanian origin. Notable people with the surname include:

 Billy Goldenberg (born 1936), American composer
 Carl Goldenberg (1907–1996), Canadian lawyer & politician
 Charles Goldenberg (1911–1986), American football player
 Chelli Goldenberg (born 1954), Israeli actress & writer & blogger
 Eddie Goldenberg (born 1948), Canadian political advisor
 Edward Goldenberg Robinson (1893–1973), American film actor (given name Emanuel Goldenberg; became Edward G. Robinson)
 Efrain Goldenberg (born 1929), Peruvian politician
 Grigory Goldenberg (1856–1880), Russian revolutionary
 Isidor Goldenberg (1870-?), Romanian actor & singer
 Larry Goldenberg (born 1953), Canadian medical researcher
 Michael Goldenberg (born 1965), American writer
 Richard Goldenberg (born 1947), French chess master
 Samuel Goldenberg (actor) (1883/1884–1945), actor in Yiddish theatre
 Samuel Löb Goldenberg (1807–1846), Austrian Hebraist and editor
 Suzanne Goldenberg, Canadian-born journalist  
 William Goldenberg (born 1959), film editor 

Other:
 Goldenberg scandal, a political scandal in Kenya involving the Goldenberg International company
 Goldenberg Candy Company, a subsidiary of the Just Born company

See also 
 Goldberg (disambiguation)
 Golden (disambiguation)

German-language surnames
Jewish surnames
Yiddish-language surnames
Surnames from ornamental names